Church Brampton is a village in West Northamptonshire in England. Together with nearby Chapel Brampton the two villages are known as The Bramptons. At the time of the 2001 census, the parish's population was 251 people. At the 2011 census the population was included in the civil parish of Church with Chapel Brampton.

The villages name means 'Broom farm/settlement'.

Its church, St. Botolph's, dates back to the early 13th century. Just outside the village are two golf clubs, Church Brampton's Northamptonshire County Golf Course and the Brampton Heath golf course, a public course.

References

External links

 A Tale of Two Villages: A Perambulation of Church with Chapel Brampton by Jack Wagstaff, a long-time resident of Chapel Brampton

Former civil parishes in Northamptonshire
Villages in Northamptonshire
West Northamptonshire District